Antoni Sułkowski is the name of:

  (1735–1796), Polish Chancellor of the Crown
 Antoni Paweł Sułkowski (1785–1836), Polish general